The 2021 Australian Swimming Championships were held from 14 to 18 April 2021 at the Gold Coast Aquatic Centre in Gold Coast, Queensland.

Following Australia's performance at the 2016 Rio Olympics where 29 medals were won and finishing 10th on the medal tally, Swimming Australia announced in the February 2017 that the timing of the selection trials would be modified. Historically, the trials were held in April several months before the Olympics were held. This will be now changed to follow the American model where the trials are held six weeks before. The 2021 Australian Swimming Trials were then held at the South Australia Aquatic and Leisure Centre from 12 to 17 June and will be selection trials for the 2020 Summer Olympics in Tokyo.

With the 2020 Australian Championships cancelled due to the COVID-19 pandemic, Swimming Australia released the 2021 swimming competition calendar in July 2020. In September 2020, it was announced that Gold Coast would be hosting the event. This meet followed the structure of the Olympic program with heats in the evenings and finals in the morning. This follows the prescient set at the 2008 Beijing Olympics where broadcaster NBC demanded this change so that the finals will be shown on primetime in the United States.

The event was held in a 10-lane pool with 10 lanes being used. This meant that two non-Australian swimmers could progress through the final. With the exception of the distance events, the heats were swum in reverse order with the fastest seeded heat first. Three finals for each event were held – men's 18–19 years, men's 21–21 years, women's 17–18 years, women's 19–20 years and men's and women's open.

There were no major withdrawals from the event with the exception of 2016 Olympian Georgia Bohl who pulled out due to a knee injury. During the Day 2 heats session, Mitch Larkin was disqualified in the heats of the 100 metre backstroke for a false start. Kyle Chalmers won the 50, 100 and 200 metre freestyle events, defending  his titles from 2019. By taking out the 50 metre butterfly event, Holly Barratt at the age of 33 became the oldest female Australian champion eclipsing the silver medallist from the 1912 Olympics Mina Wylie. Singer, songwriter Cody Simpson made his return to competitive swimming, reaching the final of the 50 metre butterfly event.

Schedule 

M = Morning session, E = Evening session

Medal winners
The medallist for the open events are below.

Men's events

Women's events

Mixed events

Legend:

Records broken
During the 2021 Australian Swimming Championships the following records were set.

All Comers and Championship records
 Women's 50 m breaststroke – Chelsea Hodges, Southport Olympic (30.20) (final)
 Women's 100 m butterfly – Emma McKeon, Griffith University (56.44) (final)

Club points scores
The final club point scores are below. Note: Only the top ten clubs are listed.

Broadcast
Following the delay of the Olympic trials by a year due to the COVID-19 pandemic, the Seven Network agreed to terminate their broadcast partnership with Swimming Australia in October 2020. The deal was announced in September 2015 and had an option to extend to 2025. In February 2021, it was announced the Amazon Prime Video had secured an exclusive, two-year live broadcast streaming deal with Swimming Australia. Both the evening heat sessions and morning final sessions were streamed live on Prime Video and on Swimming Australia's digital platform SwimTV. The commentary team consisted of Jon Harker and Giaan Rooney with Rooney conducting the poolside interviews.

References

Swimming Championships
Australian championships
Australian Swimming Championships
Sports competitions on the Gold Coast, Queensland
2010s in Queensland
Australian Swimming Championships